Paul Broome (born June 6, 1976, in Dallas, Texas) is a retired American soccer defender who played eight seasons in Major League Soccer.

Youth and college
Broome graduated from Lake Highlands High School in Dallas, Texas, where he was an All-State soccer and football player.  He also played youth soccer with the Dallas Texans Soccer Club.  He attended Southern Methodist University, playing as a midfielder and forward on the men's soccer team from 1995 to 1998.  He graduated with a degree in business administration.

Professional
Broome was drafted in the first round (12th overall) in the 1999 MLS College Draft by his hometown Dallas Burn. In 1999, Broome appeared in thirteen games, registering one goal and two assists.  He saw an enlarged role in 2000, playing a utility role for the Burn in outside midfield and left back.  He played in 20 games in 2000 and 22 games in 2001.  During the 2000 MLS offseason, Broome trained with Tottenham Hotspur of the English Premier League.

In 2002, Broome started all twenty-five games he played as a left back, registering four assists.  However, in 2003, Chris Gbandi returned from a long-term injury and replaced Broome at left back.  Broome requested a trade.  On July 23, 2003, the Burn traded Broome to the Los Angeles Galaxy along with Ryan Suarez and Antonio Martinez in exchange for Gavin Glinton and Ezra Hendrickson.

In 2003, Broome played as a left midfielder and back for the Galaxy.  In 2004, he earned a starting position, starting twenty games.  He was traded to Real Salt Lake in June 2005 and played eleven games that season.  In 2006, Broome saw no games with the RSL first team and, due to nagging injuries, he retired at the end of the season.

References

External links
 

1976 births
Living people
American soccer players
Austin Lone Stars players
FC Dallas players
LA Galaxy players
Major League Soccer players
New Orleans Riverboat Gamblers players
Real Salt Lake players
SMU Mustangs men's soccer players
A-League (1995–2004) players
MLS Pro-40 players
Soccer players from Dallas
FC Dallas draft picks
LA Galaxy non-playing staff
FC Dallas non-playing staff
Association football defenders